Jonathan "Jono" Ross (born 27 October 1990 in Sandton, Johannesburg) is a South African rugby union player who currently plays for and captains Premiership Rugby side Sale Sharks. His regular position is blindside flanker but he can also play at number 8.

Career

Youth
He also represented them in the 2008 Under-19 Provincial Championship competition.

Varsity Cup

Blue Bulls

He made his debut in the Currie Cup competition a few months later in 2011 against  and made one further appearance that season. He established himself as a regular in the team for the 2012 Vodacom Cup, making eight starts and scoring a try.

Saracens
At the conclusion of the 2012 Vodacom Cup, he joined English side Saracens for one season, making two appearances in the 2012–13 LV Cup.

Back to the Bulls

In only his third ever Currie Cup match – in the 2013 Currie Cup Premier Division season against  – he was named captain of the Blue Bulls, becoming the first-ever English-speaking captain of the team. At the end of 2013, he signed a contract extension to tie him to the Blue Bulls until October 2016.

Stade Français
In November 2014, the  announced that they granted Ross an early release from his contract to join French Top 14 side .

Sale Sharks
On 11 April 2017, it was announced that Ross would return to England to join Premiership Rugby club Sale Sharks on a three-year contract starting in the 2017-18 season. Ross was named club captain for the 2018-19 season, taking over from Will Addison. He was retained as captain for the 2019–20, 2020-2021 and 2021-2022 seasons

External links

References

South African rugby union players
Living people
Rugby union players from Johannesburg
1990 births
Blue Bulls players
Bulls (rugby union) players
Saracens F.C. players
Expatriate rugby union players in England
South African expatriate sportspeople in England
Rugby union flankers
Rugby union number eights
White South African people
South African people of British descent
South African expatriate rugby union players
South African expatriate sportspeople in France
Expatriate rugby union players in France